The Ministry of Tourism and Sports (Abrv: MOTS;) is a cabinet ministry in the Government of Thailand. The ministry's primary areas of responsibility are tourism and sports. The ministry is in charge of managing the tourist industry and sports both in schools and other institutions. The ministry organizes and directs Thailand's important sporting events. Its FY2019 budget is 6,413.9 million baht.

, the Minister of Tourism and Sports is Phiphat Ratchakitprakarn.

History
The ministry was created in 2003 during the administration of Prime Minister Thaksin Shinawatra. The government wanted a sports ministry, but the senate refused to support it as professional sports were not big enough to warrant a ministry. To overcome the objection, the government added tourism to the ministry's portfolio. Two agencies manage Thai tourism: The Tourism Authority of Thailand (TAT), is responsible for "bodycount", i.e., attracting visitors. The Department of Tourism in the Sports and Tourism Ministry regulates the industry and manages infrastructure. TAT's success in driving up numbers—more than 35 million visitors arrived in 2017—has overwhelmed the 130 employees responsible for managing the industry.

Departments

Administration
 Office of the Minister
 Office of the Permanent Secretary
 Department of Tourism
 Department of Physical Education
 Institute of Physical Education

Provincial Administration
 Office of Tourism and Sports Province Division

State enterprises
 Sports Authority of Thailand
 Tourism Authority of Thailand

See also
Tourism in Thailand
Cabinet of Thailand
List of Government Ministers of Thailand
Government of Thailand

References

External links

 
Tourism
Tourism in Thailand
Thailand
Thailand, Tourism and Sports
2002 establishments in Thailand